Emmanuel Romess Ovono Essogo (born 26 March 2001) is a Gabonese professional footballer who plays as a forward for Torpedo-BelAZ Zhodino.

References

External links 
 
 

2001 births
Living people
Sportspeople from Libreville
Gabonese footballers
Association football forwards
FC Slavia Mozyr players
FC Torpedo-BelAZ Zhodino players
Gabon youth international footballers
Gabonese expatriate footballers
Expatriate footballers in Belarus
21st-century Gabonese people